Mabata Bata, is a 2017 Mozambique documentary drama film directed by Sol de Carvalho and co-produced by the director himself along with Rodrigo Areias	and Ricardo Freitas for Bando à parte Promarte Films. The film is adapted from the short story “The Day Mabata Bata Exploded” written by Mozambican writer Mia Couto. The film describes the life of Azarias, a young orphaned shepherd who take care of the oxen herd. Even though he dreams of going to school, he is later accompany with Mabata Bata, the herd’s biggest ox to continue his life.

The TV movie version was released on 30 April 2017 in Portugal and 1 May 2017 in Brazil. On 30 January 2019, the film was released at International Film Festival Rotterdam in Netherlands. The film was shot around the locations in Chibuto, Gaza and Mozambique.

Plot

Cast
 Emílio Bila as Azarias
 Filomena Remigio as Carolina
 Esperança Naiene as Irondina
 Medianeira Massingue as Lúcia
 Mário Mabjaia as Espírito
 Horácio Guiamba as Raul
 Wilton Boene as José 
 Shcozo Ichiyama

Awards and accolades
The film received positive reviews and won several awards at international film festivals.

 II Festival Atlantis Film Awards – Special Mention Award
 Panafrican Film and Television Festival of Ouagadougou (FESPACO) – Jorge Quintela, Best Photography of a Fiction Feature Film Award
 Pan–African Festival of Cinema and Television of Ouagadougou – André Guiomar, Best Editing Award
 Antonio Loja Neves Award from the Portuguese Federation of Film Clubs (FPCC) – Best Film Award
 Kazan International Festival of Muslim Cinema, Russia, 2019 – Dialogues of Cultures in the Islamic World Award
 New York City Independent Film Festival, 2019 – Best Fiction Film Award
 Luxor African Film Festival, 2019 – Radwan El-Kashef Award for Best Film on an African theme.
 Cabo Verde International Film Festival – Best Film Award
 17th Angers African Film Festival – Young Jury Award for Best Film
 Langston Hughes African American Festival (LHAAFF), 2019 – Best Film Award

References

External links
 
 We Could Be Heroes on YouTube
 We Could Be Heroes on Facebook
 Mabata Bata
 O dia que explodiu Mabata Bata
 "The Seduction of Ash:" Mia Couto's "The Day Mabata-bata Exploded" and "The Bird-Dreaming Baobab"
 Mabata Bata film

2017 films
Tsonga-language mass media